The Mameyes River is a river of Luquillo, Puerto Rico and is also in Río Grande, Puerto Rico. It received the National Wild and Scenic River designation in 2002 and its riparian zone is 73 acres.

See also
 List of rivers of Puerto Rico

References

External links
 USGS Hydrologic Unit Map – Caribbean Region (1974)
 Ríos de Puerto Rico 

Rivers of Puerto Rico
Wild and Scenic Rivers of the United States
2002 establishments in Puerto Rico
Luquillo, Puerto Rico
Protected areas established in 2002